Peter Staecker is a former president of Institute of Electrical and Electronics Engineers. He holds degrees from Massachusetts Institute of Technology and Polytechnic Institute of Brooklyn. His professional career started in 1972 at MIT Lincoln Laboratory.

References

Polytechnic Institute of New York University alumni
Place of birth missing (living people)
Year of birth missing (living people)
Massachusetts Institute of Technology alumni
Living people
Presidents of the IEEE
MIT Lincoln Laboratory people